Celiptera codo is a moth of the family Erebidae. It is found in Mexico (Puebla).

References

Moths described in 1912
Celiptera